2015 Armed Forces Bowl can refer to:

 2015 Armed Forces Bowl (January), played as part of the 2014–15 college football bowl season between the Houston Cougars and the Pittsburgh Panthers
 2015 Armed Forces Bowl (December), played as part of the 2015–16 college football bowl season between the Air Force Falcons and the California Golden Bears